The NFL Top 100 Players of 2013 was the third season of the series. It ended with reigning NFL MVP Adrian Peterson being ranked #1, while Super Bowl MVP Joe Flacco was ranked #19.

Episode list

The list

References 

National Football League trophies and awards
National Football League records and achievements
National Football League lists